Steno is a relatively small lunar impact crater that is located in the northern hemisphere on the Moon's far side. It lies to the south-southwest of the slightly larger crater Stearns, a much younger and less worn formation. Farther to the northwest of Steno is Appleton, and to the east is Nušl.

The crater was named after the 17th century Danish astronomer Nicolas Steno.

This is a worn crater formation that has a circular outer rim that remains relatively well-defined. The rim edge is marked only by a few tiny craterlets. The interior floor and inner walls are nearly featureless, except for a few faint groove marks and some tiny craterlets. It is otherwise an undistinguished formation.

Satellite craters
By convention these features are identified on lunar maps by placing the letter on the side of the crater midpoint that is closest to Steno.

References

 
 
 
 
 
 
 
 
 
 
 

Impact craters on the Moon